The Military ranks of Mozambique form the system of hierarchical relationships in the Mozambique Defence Armed Forces (FADM). There are to basic systems of ranks, one used both by the army and the air force and the other used by the navy.

After the independence from Portugal in 1975, under the rule of Samora Machel, a Soviet-style system of rank insignia for military ranks was introduced in the then Mozambique Liberation People's Forces (FPLM). After the end of the Mozambican Civil War, the introduction of democracy and the transformation of the Mozambican armed forces into the FADM in 1994, a new system of rank insignia was introduced. This new system is loosely inspired by the Portuguese system of rank insignia.

Ranks and insignia

Commissioned officer ranks
The rank insignia of commissioned officers.

Other ranks
The rank insignia of non-commissioned officers and enlisted personnel.

Historical rank insignia (1975-1994)

Commissioned officer ranks
The People's Republic of Mozambique's rank insignia for commissioned officers.

Other ranks
The People's Republic of Mozambique's rank insignia for NCOs and enlisted personnel.

References

External links
 
 

Mozambique
Military of Mozambique